In calculus and other branches of mathematical analysis, limits involving an algebraic combination of functions in an independent variable may often be evaluated by replacing these functions by their limits; if the expression obtained after this substitution does not provide sufficient information to determine the original limit, then the expression is called an indeterminate form. A limit confirmed to be infinity is not indeterminate since it has been determined to have a specific value (infinity). The term was originally introduced by Cauchy's student Moigno in the middle of the 19th century.

There are seven indeterminate forms which are typically considered in the literature:

The most common example of an indeterminate form occurs when determining the limit of the ratio of two functions, in which both of these functions tend to zero in the limit, and is referred to as "the indeterminate form ".

So, given that two functions  and  both approaching  as  approaches some limit point , that fact alone does not give enough information for evaluating the limit

Not every undefined algebraic expression corresponds to an indeterminate form. For example, the expression  is undefined as a real number but does not correspond to an indeterminate form; any defined limit that gives rise to this form will diverge to  infinity.

An expression that arises by ways other than applying the algebraic limit theorem may have the same form of an indeterminate form. However it is not appropriate to call an expression "indeterminate form" if the expression is made outside the context of determining limits.
Another example is the expression . Whether this expression is left undefined, or is defined to equal , depends on the field of application and may vary between authors. For more, see the article Zero to the power of zero. Note that  and other expressions involving infinity are not indeterminate forms.

Some examples and non-examples

Indeterminate form 0/0 

The indeterminate form  is particularly common in calculus, because it often arises in the evaluation of derivatives using their definition in terms of limit.

As mentioned above,

while

This is enough to show that  is an indeterminate form. Other examples with this indeterminate form include

and

Direct substitution of the number that  approaches into any of these expressions shows that these are examples correspond to the indeterminate form , but these limits can assume many different values. Any desired value  can be obtained for this indeterminate form as follows:

The value  can also be obtained (in the sense of divergence to infinity):

Indeterminate form 00 

The following limits illustrate that the expression  is an indeterminate form:

Otherwise, use the transformation in the table below to evaluate the limit.

Expressions that are not indeterminate forms 

The expression  is not commonly regarded as an indeterminate form, because if the limit of  exists then there is no ambiguity as to its value, as it always diverges. Specifically, if  approaches  and  approaches , then  and  may be chosen so that:

  approaches 
  approaches 
 The limit fails to exist.

In each case the absolute value  approaches , and so the quotient  must diverge, in the sense of the extended real numbers (in the framework of the projectively extended real line, the limit is the unsigned infinity  in all three cases).

The expression  is not an indeterminate form. The expression  obtained from considering  gives the limit , provided that  remains nonnegative as  approaches .

To see why, let  where  and  By taking the natural logarithm of both sides and using  we get that  which means that

Evaluating indeterminate forms 

The adjective indeterminate does not imply that the limit does not exist, as many of the examples above show. In many cases, algebraic elimination, L'Hôpital's rule, or other methods can be used to manipulate the expression so that the limit can be evaluated.

Equivalent infinitesimal

Here is a brief proof:

For the evaluation of the indeterminate form , one can make use of the following facts about equivalent infinitesimals (e.g.,  if x becomes closer to zero):

For example:

L'Hôpital's rule

This rule states that (under appropriate conditions)

These derivatives will allow one to perform algebraic simplification and eventually evaluate the limit.

L'Hôpital's rule can also be applied to other indeterminate forms, using first an appropriate algebraic transformation. For example, to evaluate the form 00:

The right-hand side is of the form , so L'Hôpital's rule applies to it. (the domain of logarithms is the set of all positive real numbers.)

List of indeterminate forms 

The following table lists the most common indeterminate forms and the transformations for applying l'Hôpital's rule.

See also 
 Defined and undefined
 Division by zero
 Extended real number line
Indeterminate equation
Indeterminate system
Indeterminate (variable)
 L'Hôpital's rule

References 

Limits (mathematics)